Goephanes is a genus of beetles in the family Cerambycidae, containing the following species:

subgenus Cristogoephanes
 Goephanes biflavomaculatus Breuning, 1957
 Goephanes cristipennis Breuning, 1957
 Goephanes zebrinoides Breuning, 1970
 Goephanes zebrinus (Fairmaire, 1897)

subgenus Goephanes 
 Goephanes albolineatipennis Breuning, 1970
 Goephanes albosignatus Breuning, 1965
 Goephanes albosticticus Breuning, 1957
 Goephanes basiflavicornis Breuning, 1966
 Goephanes bipartitus Fairmaire, 1897
 Goephanes comorensis Breuning, 1957
 Goephanes fasciculatus Breuning, 1957
 Goephanes flavovittipennis Breuning, 1966
 Goephanes funereus (Fairmaire, 1902)
 Goephanes fuscipennis Breuning, 1970
 Goephanes fuscipes Breuning, 1957
 Goephanes fuscovariegatus Breuning, 1970
 Goephanes griveaudi Breuning, 1975
 Goephanes humeralis Breuning, 1957
 Goephanes interruptus (Fairmaire, 1902)
 Goephanes luctuosus Pascoe, 1862
 Goephanes mediovittatus Breuning, 1957
 Goephanes mediovittipennis Breuning, 1961
 Goephanes niveoplagiatus Fairmaire, 1894
 Goephanes notabilis (Fairmaire, 1905)
 Goephanes obliquepictus (Fairmaire, 1903)
 Goephanes ochreosticticus Breuning, 1957
 Goephanes olivaceus Breuning, 1938
 Goephanes pacificus (Fairmaire, 1897)
 Goephanes pictidorsis (Fairmaire, 1897)
 Goephanes pictipennis Breuning, 1961
 Goephanes pictoides Breuning, 1970
 Goephanes pictus Fairmaire, 1896
 Goephanes ralaisalamai Breuning, 1964
 Goephanes rufescens Breuning, 1938
 Goephanes rufoflavus Breuning, 1970
 Goephanes vadoni Breuning, 1970
 Goephanes varicolor Breuning, 1961
 Goephanes viettei Breuning, 1975
 Goephanes virgulifer Fairmaire, 1897

References

 
Acanthocinini